Stillwell Heady Russell (1846-1914), commonly known as Stillwell H. Russell or S. H. Russell, was a lawyer, politician, U.S. marshal, member of the Texas Congress, a soldier in the Confederate Army, and, at the time of his death, justice of the Oklahoma Supreme Court (OSC). Born in Marshall, Harrison County, Texas, he moved to what would become the state of Oklahoma after 1870 and before 1910.  Although he lived a relatively full and adventurous life, his career on the OSC was cut short by illness. Re-elected to this high position in the fall of 1914, he died before the end of the calendar year and the beginning of his second term.

Early life 
S. H. Russell was born in Brazoria County, Texas on Valentine's Day (February 14), 1846 to William Jarvis (1802-1881) and Eleanor (Heady) Russell (1817-1890).  Little about his early life has been published except that he attended the Texas Military Institute and farmed until the U.S. Civil War intruded. He enlisted as a private in the 25th Regiment of the Texas Cavalry, fighting for the Confederate Army. His military career was evidently unremarkable, because he emerged as still a private at the end of hostilities.

Returning to civilian life, Russell got a job as a clerk in a Brazoria, Texas dry goods store. He used his spare time to study law in the offices of Lathrop and McCormick. In 1869, he was admitted to the Texas bar, and soon afterwards moved to Galveston, Texas.

Texas politics 
Russell was selected as City Attorney for both Houston and Galveston in 1870. Texas Governor Edmund Davis appointed Russell as District Attorney, covering both Harrison and Rusk Counties in East Texas. He held that post until 1872, when he was elected sheriff of Harrison County, remaining in that position until 1876. In 1875, he was also a delegate to the Texas State Constitutional Convention, where he served on the committees on the Legislative Department and Revenue and Taxation.

Russell decided to run for election to the U.S. House of Representatives from Texas' 2nd Congressional District. Despite winning endorsements from both the Tyler Index and the Galveston Daily News, his one-term incumbent Democratic opponent, David Culbertson, beat him handily in the 1876 general election.  Undaunted, he ran for Harrison County Tax Collector in 1877 and won the post. He resigned for unknown reasons in the same year, and in 1878 was appointed by President Hayes as U.S. Marshal for the Western District of Texas.

In the late 1870s, Russell headed an investigation of train robberies allegedly committed by the notorious Sam Bass gang. This had no positive effect on his political career. In November 1882, he ran for election again to the U.S. Congress, this time for the Texas 3rd Congressional District, opposing Democrat James Henry Jones.

Legal problems and prison sentence 
In March 1882, Department of Justice agents discovered irregularities in the accounts that Russell kept in his office. Several suits were brought against him during the month. In May, he was charged with misappropriating government funds, arrested and put under a $4,000 bond. More charges were made in early 1883, "on the account of irregularities in summoning juries". Russell went on trial in San Antonio starting March 29, 1883. By the end of April, Russell was convicted of "rendering false accounts to the government." Monetary claims were in the range of 40 to 50 thousand dollars. He was sentenced to two years in prison, to be served at the Illinois State Penitentiary at Chester, Illinois.

Release and return to civilian life 
By July 1883, Russell had been assigned to a prison clerkship and to work in the brickyard. Some of Russell's friends and supporters started a campaign for his early release.  Russell was released in February 1885, after serving 21 months. He went to live in Denison, Texas, where he could reestablish his law practice.

Return to Oklahoma 
Russell's welcome on returning to Texas was certainly warm. By 1895, the Texas chapter of the International Order of Odd Fellows selected him as a delegate to its convention in Atlantic City, New Jersey. In April 1899, he participated in an IOOF encampment in Oklahoma Territory, where he decided to start a new life. He and Edgar Wilhelm opened a law office in Ardmore in December, 1899. Shortly after Oklahoma was declared a state on November 16, 1907, he plunged back into politics, leaving the Republican fold to become a member of the Democratic party and soon was elected judge of Oklahoma's 8th District. He was reelected in 2010 as a Democrat, defeating Republican James Humphrey by a vote of 2,797 to 1,204.

In March 1914, incumbent Associate Justice Robert Lee Williams resigned his seat on the Oklahoma State Supreme Court to run for election as governor. The incumbent governor, Lee Cruce appointed S. H. Russell as the replacement for Williams.

Death 
Within two months after his appointment, Justice Russell became ill at a meeting of the Oklahoma Bar Association. A few days later, he felt well enough to attend a regular session of the court. He died three days later, on March 16, 1914, in his room at the Lee-Huckins Hotel in Oklahoma City. The cause of death was called "a weak heart," with an "attack of acute indigestion" as a contributing factor.

Justice Russell's body was conveyed to Ardmore, Oklahoma, where his funeral was conducted at the First Presbyterian Church on May 20, 1914. A large number of state dignitaries attended the service.

Notes

References 

1846 births
1914 deaths
People of Texas in the American Civil War
United States Marshals
People from Marshall, Texas
People from Alva, Oklahoma
People from Galveston, Texas
People from Denison, Texas
People from Ardmore, Oklahoma
Justices of the Oklahoma Supreme Court
U.S. state supreme court judges admitted to the practice of law by reading law
19th-century American judges